Christian Frossard is a French former slalom canoeist who competed in the 1970s.

He won a gold medal in the K-1 team event at the 1977 ICF Canoe Slalom World Championships in Spittal.

References
Overview of athlete's results at canoeslalom.net

French male canoeists
Possibly living people
Year of birth missing (living people)
Medalists at the ICF Canoe Slalom World Championships